Terasaki Kōgyō or Terazaki Kōgyō (born Chutaro Terasaki or Terazaki; 1866–1919) was a Japanese painter who completed many works for the publishing house Hakubunkan and their literary magazine Bungei Kurabu.

Biography
Kōgyō was born in Dewa Province. He began painting at the age of 16. In 1888, at the age of 20, Kōgyō studied under the painter Hoan (Hirafuku Suian, 1844–90) and changed to the style of the Shijō school. When the Russo-Japanese War started, he joined the Imperial Army of Japan as a painter.

References

Further reading
 S. Noma (ed.): Terazaki Kōgyō. In: Japan. An Illustrated Encyclopedia. Kodansha, 1993 , p. 1555
 Tazawa, Yutaka: Terazaki Kōgyō. In: Biographical Dictionary of Japanese Art. Kodansha International, 1981 ISBN 087011488
 Laurance P. Roberts: Terazaki Kōgyō. In: A Dictionary of Japanese Artists. Weatherhill, 1976 

19th-century Japanese painters
1866 births
1919 deaths
20th-century Japanese painters